Beaker may refer to:

Containers
 Beaker (drinkware), a beverage container
 Beaker (laboratory equipment), a glass container used for holding liquids in a laboratory setting
 Beaker (archaeology), a prehistoric drinking vessel
 Beaker culture, the archaeological culture often called the Beaker people
 Sippy cup, referred to as a beaker in UK English

Other
 Beaker (Muppet), the hapless assistant of Dr. Bunsen Honeydew on The Muppet Show
 Beaker (web browser), a peer-to-peer browser with tools to create and host websites.
 Beaker Street with Clyde Clifford, underground music program 1967–2011 hosted by Clyde Clifford
 Norman Beaker, British guitarist
 Tracy Beaker, a fictional character

See also
 Beker (disambiguation)